Vrh pri Dolskem ( or ) is a dispersed settlement in the hills northeast of Dolsko in the Municipality of Dol pri Ljubljani in the Upper Carniola region of Slovenia.

Name
The name of the settlement was changed from Vrh Svetega Križa (literally, 'Holy Cross Peak') to Vrh (literally, 'peak') in 1952. The name was changed on the basis of the 1948 Law on Names of Settlements and Designations of Squares, Streets, and Buildings as part of efforts by Slovenia's postwar communist government to remove religious elements from toponyms. The name was changed again to Vrh pri Dolskem (literally, 'peak near Dolsko') in 1955.

References

External links

Vrh pri Dolskem on Geopedia

Populated places in the Municipality of Dol pri Ljubljani